Visual modeling is the graphic representation of objects and systems of interest using graphical languages.  Visual modeling is a way for experts and novices to have a common understanding of otherwise complicated ideas.  By using visual models complex ideas are not held to human limitations, allowing for greater complexity without a loss of  comprehension.  Visual modeling can also be used to bring a group to a consensus.  Models help effectively communicate ideas among designers, allowing for quicker discussion and an eventual consensus.  Visual modeling languages may be General-Purpose Modeling (GPM) languages (e.g., UML, Southbeach Notation, IDEF) or Domain-Specific Modeling (DSM) languages (e.g., SysML). Visual modelling in computer science had no standard before the 90's, and was incomparable until the introduction of the UML.  They include industry open standards (e.g., UML, SysML, Modelica), as well as proprietary standards, such as the visual languages associated with VisSim, MATLAB and Simulink, OPNET, NetSim, NI Multisim, and Reactive Blocks. Both VisSim and Reactive Blocks provide a royalty-free, downloadable viewer that lets anyone open and interactively simulate their models. The community edition of Reactive Blocks also allows full editing of the models as well as compilation, as long as the work is published under the Eclipse Public License.  Visual modeling languages are an area of active research that continues to evolve, as evidenced by increasing interest in DSM languages, visual requirements, and visual OWL (Web Ontology Language).

See also
 Service-oriented modeling 
 Domain-specific modeling 
 Model-driven engineering 
 Modeling language

References

External links
Visual Modeling Forum A web community dedicated to visual modeling languages and tools.

Programming language topics
Unified Modeling Language
Simulation programming languages